Nanmangalam Reserve Forest is a protected forest located in  Chengalpattu district, about 24 km from the city centre. It is located at Medavakkam on Velachery High Road between Velachery and Tambaram. The reserve forest has an area of 320 hectares. However, the total area of the forest is 2,400 hectares.

The forest
The forest is popular among bird watchers and is home to about 85 species of birds. Red-wattled lapwing, Hoopoe, crested honey buzzard, grey partridge, coucal, Indian eagle-owl, white-breasted kingfisher, pied kingfisher, southern bush lark and red-whiskered bulbul are commonly seen in the area.

The 320-hectare Nanmangalam Reserved Forest, located about 10 km from Velachery, is a scrubland around an abandoned granite quarry and is home to some of the rare territorial orchids, according to a recent study.

The state forest department has entrusted the work of data collection in this small forest area to Care Earth, a bio-diversity research organisation. Located near Medavakkam, a rapidly developing residential locality, the forest needs immediate fencing to protect it from encroachment and to curtail any non-forestry activity there, the study says.

The neighbourhood of Nanmangalam is one of the 163 notified areas (megalithic sites) in the state of Tamil Nadu.

See also
 Birding in Chennai
 Vandalur Reserve Forest

References

Geography of Chennai
Protected areas of Tamil Nadu
Reserved forests of India
Protected areas with year of establishment missing